Hitori no Yoru (ヒトリノ夜) (English: Lonely night) is the second single by the Japanese pop-rock band Porno Graffitti. It was released on January 26, 2000, and reached number 12 on the Oricon singles chart. The song was used as opening theme of the anime Great Teacher Onizuka.

Track listing

References

2000 singles
Porno Graffitti songs
Anime songs
SME Records singles
2000 songs